Pelopidas assamensis, the great swift, is a butterfly belonging to the family Hesperiidae. It was found in the Mandai area of Singapore.  The caterpillar was discovered in the Bukit Timah Nature Reserve feeding on a bamboo plant.

References

Pelopidas (skipper)
Butterflies of Asia
Butterflies of Singapore
Butterflies of Indochina
Butterflies described in 1882